Resource nationalism is the tendency of people and governments to assert control over natural resources located on their territory. As a result, resource nationalism conflicts with the interests of multinational corporations.

The approach of peak oil has led many governments to take ownership or control of fossil fuel reservoirs for strategic and economic reasons, although resource nationalism applies to other resources, such as metals, or in less developed nations, mining investment.

It is mainly enforced as an economic policy (usually in populist governments) that relies on state ownership or control of natural resources located on their territories to advance political, social or industrial objectives. This emphasizes that resources belong to the people of the country in question first and foremost, and that state employment is the best manager of resources against privatization. 

A recent tide of resource nationalism appeared during the period of economic liberalisation in Latin America in the 1990s, with populations and governments looking for independence of the country in terms of export and resources. An example includes the Cochabamba Water War, a series of protests against privatization of the city's water supply that took place in Bolivia. As a result, less than six months later the government cancelled the contract. 

Governments that have adopted elements of resource nationalism include Bolivia under Evo Morales, Argentina under Cristina Fernández de Kirchner, and Venezuela under Hugo Chávez.

References

Further reading
Hollingsworth, Brian, "Resource Nationalism and Energy Integration in Latin America: The Paradox of Populism" (2018). FIU Electronic Theses and Dissertations. 3790. https://digitalcommons.fiu.edu/etd/3790

Johnson, Toni (13 August 2007). "The Return of Resource Nationalism". Council on Foreign Relations. Archived from the original on 20 July 2016.

Mares, David R. "Resource Nationalism and Energy Security in Latin America: Implication for Global Oil Supplies." (2010). https://digitalrepository.unm.edu/la_energy_dialog/74

Nationalism
Resources